Chris Wheeler born in Swanage is a celebrated local chef in Buckinghamshire. Children Vittoria and Vanessa wheeler (twins aged 13)

Career 
Chris Wheeler, author of "The Ginger Chef 'Served Up'", started his career at the Domaine De Bassible Hotel and Michelin starred restaurant located in the French town of Segos. Before going on to become Jean-Christophe Novelli's right-hand man, Chris worked with Jean-Christophe Novelli for 10 years, becoming the youngest Sous Chef at the time in a Michelin starred restaurant. From Sous Chef, becoming Group Head Chef working at the Four Seasons Park Lane, Le Provence, Lymington, Maison Novelli and Les Saveurs, Mayfair.

Joining Stoke Park Country Club, Spa and Hotel in 2003, Chris has been building Stoke Park's culinary reputation. Head Chef of Humphry's (3 AA Rosette Restaurant) and Executive Chef. In July 2018, Chris Wheeler released his debut cook book "The Ginger Chef 'Served Up'"

Television work

Awards and accolades 

In 2016, Chris Wheeler appeared on BBC 2's Great British Menu, representing the South West.

In the press 
Chris Wheeler has featured in OK! Magazine and Hello Magazine with featured recipes and interviews. Chris Wheeler writes a monthly food column for The Buckinghamshire Advertiser showcasing his favourite 'at home' recipes along with tips, flavours and flares of cooking.

References

Further reading
 
 
 
 

Living people
British chefs
Year of birth missing (living people)